The Old Stone Fort is a prehistoric Native American structure located in Coffee County, Tennessee, in the Southeastern United States.  The structure was most likely built between 80 and 550 AD during the Middle Woodland period. It is the most complex hilltop enclosure found in the South and was likely used for ceremonial purposes rather than defense.
 
 The structure is now part of Old Stone Fort State Archaeological Park, one of two archaeological parks in Tennessee (the other being at Pinson Mounds near Jackson).  The site is listed on the National Register of Historic Places.

Geographic setting

The Old Stone Fort is located on a peninsula created by the confluence of the Duck River and the Little Duck River (the section of the Duck River upstream from its confluence with the Little Duck is sometimes called "Barren Fork"). The Duck River forms the peninsula's northwestern boundary, the Little Duck forms the peninsula's southeastern boundary, and a westward bend in the Little Duck forms the peninsula's southern boundary. (Click for Map)

The Duck River system spills over a limestone-rich shelf of the western Cumberland Plateau known as the Highland Rim.  As the Duck and Little Duck approach their convergence, they rapidly drop in elevation, and have cut relatively deep gorges around the peninsula upon which the ancient structure is located.  Both gorges are highlighted by a series of substantial waterfalls and whitewater rapids.  The natural waterpower in these two gorges attracted entrepreneurs and millwrights throughout the 19th century.

The Old Stone Fort is located entirely within Coffee County, and is situated just west of Manchester, Tennessee.  Old Stone Fort State Archaeological Park encompasses  and is managed by the Tennessee Department of Environment and Conservation.

The structure of the Old Stone Fort

The walls of the Old Stone Fort consist of stone and earthwork, and are on average approximately 4–6 feet high.  The walls originally consisted of an inner and outer layer of crudely stacked rocks and slabs with gravel and earthen fill in between.  Over the centuries, the earthen fill has spilled over the rock layers, giving the walls their current mound-like appearance.  
 
The walls can be divided into roughly three sections, with two sections running roughly parallel to the Duck and Little Duck Rivers, and a third section running parallel to the southern rim of the peninsula.  The sections paralleling the rivers gradually move inward, away from their respective rivers, and approach one another in a pincer-like formation at the northeastern half of the peninsula.  Here, both walls terminate just before converging, allowing for a small entrance.  Two ancient "pedestal" mounds— one  in diameter and the other  in diameter— are located on either side of the structure's entrance.  The entrance continues through a  L-shaped corridor which opens into the structure's interior.

Large open sections are found between both the southern wall and the northwestern wall and the southern wall and the southeastern wall. These areas were probably left open due to the fact that they overlook steep bluffs carved out by the Duck and Little Duck rivers whose waters probably performed the same function as the mounds.

A substantial ditch, known as the "moat",  parallels the southern wall at the base of the ridge. This ditch is a natural feature and is actually an abandoned river channel. However, it is not known if this channel was artificially kept open in prehistory.<ref>Information in the section obtained from Charles Faulkner, The Old Stone Fort: Exploring an Archaeological Mystery (Knoxville, Tenn.: University of Tennessee Press, 1971), 3-6, 35-36, 50-51.</ref>

The Old Stone Fort in recorded history

By the time white long hunters and traders arrived in the area in the mid-18th century, a system of well-worn trails traversed the Cumberland Plateau, connecting what is now Middle Tennessee with Georgia and Northern Alabama. One trail passed near the Old Stone Fort, closely following what is now U.S. Route 41. The ancient structure was no doubt an important landmark to early travelers in the Middle Tennessee area.

The Nickajack Expedition, led by Major James Ore in the latter part of the Cherokee–American wars, is believed to have encamped within the Old Stone Fort en route to the Chickamauga towns. The structure also had an important symbolic significance for early Coffee County residents. The county's first court was held at the "Old Stone Fort Tavern" in 1836, and the county seat was laid out upon "Main Stone Fort Creek."

The powerful Duck River made the Old Stone Fort's peninsula an attractive site for mills as early as 1823, when Samuel Murray built a rope factory on the Little Duck River. Although the factory burned in 1847, it was followed by W.S. Whitman's paper mill further downstream in 1852. In 1862, Whitman built a powder factory adjacent to his paper mill to supply the Confederacy during the Civil War; it was destroyed by Union troops the following year. In 1879, the Stone Fort Paper Company built a large mill near Big Falls on the Duck River. The mill supplied paper to newspapers throughout the Southeast— including the Nashville Banner and the Atlanta Constitution— until the early 20th century.  The mill's foundations are on the bluffs overlooking Big Falls, and can be accessed via the Old Stone Fort Loop Trail.

The property containing the Old Stone Fort was eventually passed into the hands of the Chumbley family, who had ties to Stone Fort Paper. The Chumbleys, seeking to protect the Old Stone Fort, passed up numerous private offers for the land the ancient structure was located on. In 1966, the State of Tennessee purchased  of the Chumbley estate that became the core of Old Stone Fort State Archaeological Park. The Old Stone Fort was added to the National Register of Historic Places in 1973.

The Old Stone Fort's builders and function

Who built the Old Stone Fort?

The Old Stone Fort remained a mystery until the University of Tennessee conducted archaeological excavations in 1966.  Throughout the 19th and early 20th century, various theories tried to identify the builders.

In 1823, the Pioneer'', a Jackson, Tennessee newspaper, argued the Old Stone Fort was built by Buccaneers from Seville after one of their ships wrecked off the coast of Florida and forced them inland. In the mid-20th century, the discoveries at L'Anse aux Meadows and the discovery of apparent Viking artifacts in various parts of North America led many to believe the Vikings built stone structures in the Eastern U.S.A., including the Old Stone Fort.

The first serious investigation of the Old Stone Fort was conducted by Joseph Jones for the Smithsonian Institution in 1876 and uncovered several prehistoric artifacts. He was followed by Tennessee State Archaeologist P.E. Cox in 1928, who dug several trenches and analyzed the fort's composition.

In 1966, after the purchase of the Old Stone Fort, the University of Tennessee Department of Anthropology investigated the structure's origins.  Digging a series of trenches and test pits and conducting extensive research, the investigators determined the builders to be Native Americans of the Middle Woodland period. Charles Faulkner, a member of the excavation team, based this on three findings:

 Radiocarbon analysis of charcoal samples found within the structure's walls all dated to approximately 30-430 AD, in the Middle Woodland period.
 The structure's composition, setting, and layout is similar to other structures built by Middle Woodland cultures, such as the Hopewell people of Ohio and the Pinson Mound builders in West Tennessee.

The University of Tennessee determined the fort was built gradually over a period of several hundred years. The builders are believed to be two distinct local Middle Woodland cultures known as the McFarland and the Owl Hollow cultures, the first beginning work in the 1st century AD and the second completing it.

Purpose of the Old Stone Fort

For decades, it was largely assumed the structure was used for military defense. Evidence from the 1966 excavations, however, points more to a religious or ceremonial function. Faulkner based this on the following:

 Defensive structures are typically constructed quickly in response to a threat, but the Old Stone Fort was constructed gradually over several centuries.
 The walls are not high enough to have been used for defense, and no evidence of a palisade was found.
 The area within the walls is large and its defense would require much more than a typical Middle Woodland fighting force.
 The 1966 excavations turned up almost no cultural artifacts, which implies the enclosure was kept clean and not continuously inhabited by its builders.

The "moat" that parallels the base of the southwestern edge of the peninsula was originally considered artificial, although researchers now believe it may be a natural dry riverbed.

The Old Stone Fort Museum

The Old Stone Fort Museum, built by Tennessee State Parks, is located near the park entrance. The museum's exhibits interpret the theories regarding the fort's builders, archaeological excavations at the site, small theater, small welcome/gift shop center, historical lineage of early Native Americans, and the culture of its builders. An observation deck atop the museum displays information about the Old Stone Fort and surrounding rivers and views of the Blue Hole Falls.

See also
Fort Mountain (Murray County, Georgia)

References

External links

Old Stone Fort State Archaeological Park — official site
Old Stone Fort - TN History for Kids, park description and photos

Hopewellian peoples
Archaeological sites on the National Register of Historic Places in Tennessee
Native American museums in Tennessee
Archaeological museums in Tennessee
State parks of Tennessee
Old Stone Fort
Museums in Coffee County, Tennessee
Protected areas of Coffee County, Tennessee
Pre-statehood history of Tennessee
Archaeological parks
National Register of Historic Places in Coffee County, Tennessee